Batman: Arkham is a series of action-adventure video games based on the DC Comics character Batman, developed by Rocksteady Studios and WB Games Montréal, and published originally by Eidos Interactive and Warner Bros. Interactive Entertainment. The franchise consists of four main installments and an upcoming spin-off, along with four smaller titles for mobile devices, a virtual reality game, tie-in comic books, and an animated film. The continuity established by the games is often referred to as the Arkhamverse.

Eidos had obtained the rights to make a Batman game from Warner Bros. in early 2007 and approached Rocksteady. The first two games in the series, Batman: Arkham Asylum and Batman: Arkham City, were written by veteran Batman writer Paul Dini and featured voice actors Kevin Conroy and Mark Hamill reprising their roles as Batman and the Joker, respectively, from the DC Animated Universe (DCAU). Conroy and Hamill returned to voice their characters in the fourth main installment of the series, Batman: Arkham Knight.  Additional voice actors who reprised their characters from the DCAU include Arleen Sorkin as Harley Quinn in Batman: Arkham Asylum and Robert Costanzo and CCH Pounder as Harvey Bullock and Amanda Waller in Batman: Arkham Origins, respectively.

The main games in the Batman: Arkham series have been met with positive commercial success and critical acclaim, with praise for their narratives, voice acting, world design, graphics, and gameplay. The games have collectively sold more than 30 million copies worldwide.

Games

Main series

Batman: Arkham Asylum (2009)

Batman: Arkham Asylum, the first game in the series, was written by veteran Batman writer Paul Dini and developed by Rocksteady. The game takes place entirely on Arkham Island, which houses the eponymous Arkham Asylum, home of some of Batman's most notorious foes. In the main storyline, Batman must once again stop his archenemy, the Joker, who has instigated an elaborate plot to seize control of Arkham and trap Batman on the island, while threatening Gotham City with hidden bombs. While fighting through the Asylum's inmates and attempting to restore order, Batman learns that the Joker has gained possession of a large quantity of Titan, an experimental chemical based on Venom, the drug used by Bane to enhance his powers, and must destroy it before the Joker can use it for his nefarious schemes. Kevin Conroy and Mark Hamill respectively voice Batman and the Joker in the game, reprising their roles from the DC Animated Universe.

After its initial release, Arkham Asylum received downloadable content (DLC) that added new maps to the game's challenge mode, as well as the Joker as a playable character (albeit only on the PlayStation 3 and Return to Arkham versions).

Batman: Arkham City (2011)

Batman: Arkham City is the sequel to Arkham Asylum and features a bigger cast of characters and a story again written by Paul Dini, along with Paul Crocker and Sefton Hill. Set 18 months after Arkham Asylum, the game sees Bruce Wayne incarcerated within Arkham City, a new super-prison based in the decaying urban slums of Gotham City, established by former Arkham Asylum warden and current Gotham mayor Quincy Sharp. While contending with various inmates taking advantage of Arkham City's lawlessness, Batman must uncover the secret behind a sinister scheme, code-named "Protocol 10", orchestrated by the facility's warden, Hugo Strange. At the same time, the Joker is slowly dying due to the unstable properties of the Titan formula in his blood, and infects Batman with the same disease to force him to find a cure. Kevin Conroy and Mark Hamill reprise their respective roles as Batman and the Joker.

Arkham City introduces side missions to the series, each focusing on different villains whose schemes Batman must thwart. It also features DLC that adds Catwoman as a playable character, along with her own campaign that runs parallel with the main story. In addition to Batman and Catwoman, the game's challenge mode also features Nightwing and Robin as playable characters. Another DLC, titled Harley Quinn's Revenge, adds a second campaign, set after the main story, in which Robin must rescue Batman after he is captured by a vengeful Harley Quinn in Arkham City.

Batman: Arkham Origins (2013)

Batman: Arkham Origins is a prequel to the series, taking place eight years before the events of Arkham Asylum. It was developed by WB Games Montréal and written by Assassin's Creed and Prince of Persia writers Corey May and Dooma Wendschuh. The game is the first in the series to feature multiplayer gameplay, developed by Splash Damage. The story follows a younger, less refined, and less experienced Batman, who has a bounty placed on his head by Black Mask, drawing eight of the world's deadliest assassins to Gotham City on Christmas Eve. While attempting to bring Black Mask to justice, Batman must also contend with the police, who want to apprehend him for his vigilantism, and other villains taking advantage of the chaos in Gotham. The plot features key moments in Batman's career, such as his first encounter with the Joker, and the beginning of his partnership and friendship with Jim Gordon. Arkham Origins features roughly the same setting as Arkham City—Old Gotham—but with several changes to reflect the different time period, as the area has yet to be transformed into Arkham City. The setting also incorporates a new area of the city, called New Gotham, located in the south, and the Batcave. Roger Craig Smith and Troy Baker voice Batman and the Joker, respectively, replacing Conroy and Hamill from the previous two games.

Like its predecessors, the game features DLC that adds new challenge maps and costumes for Batman, as well as Bruce Wayne and Deathstroke as playable characters in the challenge mode. The Cold, Cold Heart DLC adds a new story-driven campaign, set a week after the events of the main story, on New Year's Eve; it depicts Batman's first encounter with Mr. Freeze, borrowing heavy inspiration from the Batman: The Animated Series episode "Heart of Ice".

Batman: Arkham Knight (2015)

Batman: Arkham Knight is the sequel to Arkham City and the biggest installment in the series. Intended to be the final Batman: Arkham game, it was developed once again by Rocksteady, and released for the PlayStation 4, Xbox One and Windows on June 23, 2015. Set nine months after the events of Arkham City, the game sees the return of the villain Scarecrow, who forces a citywide evacuation in Gotham and unites several of Batman's greatest villains in an attempt to destroy the Dark Knight once and for all. Scarecrow is aided by the mysterious Arkham Knight, who has a personal vendetta against Batman and seems to know all of his secrets. Although aided by several allies, Batman's quest to stop the villains is hindered by the Joker, who, despite his death in Arkham City, lives on as a hallucination in Batman's mind and is slowly taking over his body. Arkham Knight is set in Uptown Gotham, which is located west of City and Origins' Old and New Gotham, and comprises three main islands: Bleake Island, Miagani Island, and Founders' Island. Kevin Conroy and Mark Hamill reprise their roles as Batman and the Joker, respectively.

DLC released for the game includes four side missions centered around the villains Killer Croc, Ra's al Ghul, Mr. Freeze, and Mad Hatter; short story-driven missions set both before and after the main story, focusing on characters other than Batman, such as Batgirl, Red Hood, Harley Quinn, Nightwing, Robin, and Catwoman; additional challenge maps; and skins for both the playable characters and the Batmobile (which makes its debut in the series as a driveable vehicle).

Suicide Squad: Kill the Justice League (2023)

A Suicide Squad game was first considered a possibility following the end of Batman: Arkham Origins, which featured a post-credits scene in which Deathstroke is asked by Amanda Waller to join the Suicide Squad. In the years after Batman: Arkham Knight released, there were rumors suggesting the studio was working on a Suicide Squad game, but no official announcement was made from the development team or publisher. In December 2016, Jason Schreier from Kotaku revealed that the title had been cancelled, and WB Games Montreal shifted their focus to a Batman: Arkham soft reboot set several years after the ending of Rocksteady's main storyline and starring Damian Wayne as the new Batman. In April 2017, Schreier reported that even the Damian title was canned and turned into a different Batman game which was revealed to be Gotham Knights at the 2020 DC FanDome. As a result, Rocksteady Studios took over as the main developer of the game. Rocksteady was initially rumored to be working on a Superman-themed game, which they later debunked. The game's official artwork was revealed by Rocksteady on August 7, 2020. The first trailer for the game premiered at DC FanDome. On March 23, 2022, Rocksteady announced that the game had been delayed from its intended 2022 launch window to Spring 2023. The game will mark Kevin Conroy's final performance as Batman, following his death in November 2022.

As the game is set in the Arkhamverse, plot threads established in the Batman: Arkham series would continue in Suicide Squad: Kill the Justice League. The game will feature co-op gameplay and will allow players to choose from four playable characters—Harley Quinn, Deadshot, Captain Boomerang, and King Shark. In the main storyline, Brainiac attacks Metropolis and enslaves most of the Justice League with his mind-controlling technology, forcing Amanda Waller to assemble a task force of former Arkham Asylum inmates to stop him.

Other games

Batman: Arkham City Lockdown (2011)

Batman: Arkham City Lockdown is an iOS and Android fighting game developed by NetherRealm Studios, the creators of Mortal Kombat, which serves as a spin-off and prequel to the events of Batman: Arkham City. The game features voice acting, with most of the actors their roles from Arkham Asylum and Arkham City.

Batman: Arkham Origins (mobile) (2013)

Batman: Arkham Origins is an iOS and Android fighting game developed by NetherRealm Studios. It plays similarly to Arkham City Lockdown, and follows the same storyline as the console and PC versions of the game.

Batman: Arkham Origins Blackgate (2013)

Batman: Arkham Origins Blackgate is a side-scrolling game developed for the PlayStation Vita and Nintendo 3DS by Armature Studio. Set three months after the events of Arkham Origins, the story sees Batman investigating a mysterious explosion at Blackgate Prison that set the inmates free and allowed notorious crime bosses Joker, Black Mask, and Penguin to take over the prison. With the help of Catwoman, whom he encounters for the first time, Batman attempts to bring all three crime bosses to justice, in the process uncovering a dark secret about his newfound ally. A deluxe edition of the game, featuring new maps, enemy encounters, difficulty levels, batsuits and enhanced visuals, was released on the PlayStation 3, Xbox 360, Wii U and Microsoft Windows in April 2014.

Batman: Arkham Underworld (2016)
Batman: Arkham Underworld  is an iOS and Android game developed by Turbine, Inc. and released on iOS on July 14, 2016. Set a few years before the events of Arkham Asylum, the game gives players control over a team of villains—including infamous Batman enemies such as the Riddler, Harley Quinn, Mr. Freeze, Killer Croc, Scarecrow, and Bane—and has them build hideouts and recruit henchmen, with the goal of becoming Gotham City's "next criminal kingpin". Arkham Underworld features voice acting, with many actors reprising their roles from the main installments in the series. The game was shut down in 2017.

Batman: Arkham VR (2016)

In June 2016 at E3 2016, it was announced that Rocksteady was developing a Batman: Arkham game for the PlayStation VR, which released in October 2016. The game is set a few weeks prior to the events of Arkham Knight, and has players "utilize [Batman's] legendary gadgets to unravel a plot that threatens the lives of his closest allies." It was released for the Oculus Rift and HTC Vive on April 25, 2017.

Collections

Batman: Arkham Bundle (2013)
On September 23, 2013, the Batman: Arkham Bundle was released in North America for the PlayStation 3 and Xbox 360, as a Greatest Hits and Platinum Hits collection, respectively. It features the Game of the Year edition of Arkham Asylum, which includes the "Totally Insane", "Nocturnal Hunter", "Crime Alley" and "Scarecrow Nightmare" challenge maps, and the Game of the Year edition of Arkham City, which includes all additional content, including multiple skin DLC packs, as well as the extended story "Harley Quinn's Revenge".

Batman: Arkham Collection (2013)
On November 22, 2013, the Batman: Arkham Collection was released in Europe for the PlayStation 3, Xbox 360 and Microsoft Windows. The collection features downloadable versions of Arkham Asylum and Arkham City, and a physical copy of Arkham Origins. In addition, the PlayStation 3 version features the Knightfall DLC pack for Arkham Origins, while Arkham Asylum and Arkham City are the Game of the Year editions on Windows.

Batman: Return to Arkham (2016)
Batman: Return to Arkham, developed by Virtuos, features remastered versions of Arkham Asylum and Arkham City using Unreal Engine 4 for the PlayStation 4 and Xbox One. Additionally, both games include all previously released downloadable content, and feature improved graphics, upgraded models and environments, as well as improvements in the lighting, effects and shaders. The collection was released on October 18, 2016, to mixed reviews. Reviewers noted improvements to the textures and shading, but had split opinions on the visual design and lighting effects. The collection was also criticized for issues with its frame rate, having been capped at 30 frames per second.

Batman: Arkham Collection (2019) 
On September 6, 2019, the Batman: Arkham Collection was released in Europe for PlayStation 4 and Xbox One. It contains the remastered versions of Arkham Asylum and Arkham City from Return to Arkham and the premium edition of Arkham Knight. The physical edition of the collection includes discs for the first two games and a digital download code for the third game.

Characters

Other media

Music
The first two games were composed by Nick Arundel and Ron Fish. Origins was composed by Christopher Drake, with Arkham Knight being composed by Arundel and David Buckley. Several soundtrack albums have been released.

Comics

Batman: Arkham Asylum tie-in 
A 16-page, single-issue comic, Batman: Arkham Asylum – The Road to Arkham, was included in limited editions of Batman: Arkham Asylum. It is a prequel to the game and is written by Alan Burnett and illustrated by Carlos D'Anda.

Batman: Arkham City tie-ins

Starting in May 2011, DC Comics released a five-issue miniseries titled Batman: Arkham City. The miniseries was meant to bridge the gap between the story of Arkham Asylum and Arkham City the game. The series is written by Paul Dini, who wrote both Arkham Asylum and Arkham City, and is drawn by Arkham Asylum and Arkham City concept artist Carlos D’anda. The miniseries picks up one year after Arkham Asylum, where former Arkham Warden Quincy Sharp, now Mayor of Gotham City, has decided to close down Arkham Asylum. He decides to create “Arkham City” as the new “home” for all of Gotham City's thugs, gangsters and insane criminal masterminds, set in the heart of Gotham City. Inmates are under the watchful eye of Dr. Hugo Strange, and can roam free and do whatever they want as long as they don't try to escape.

In addition, 8-page digital-first interludes were released to expand on the story included in the miniseries, and were written once again by Dini as well as Derek Fridolfs and drawn by a variety of artists. The interludes focus on Batman's enemies as they vie for power within Arkham City. The interludes were later included in print in the Batman: Arkham City collected edition.

Batman: Arkham Unhinged is an original digital comic series that released in October 2011 alongside Arkham City the game. Derek Fridolfs is the main series writer and is drawn by many different artists. The stories spin directly out of events in the game itself, or are flashbacks to events prior to either game, allowing expansion on the background of the characters as they may have existed pre-Arkham City. The stories focus on Batman prominently, but some highlight the villains and the supporting characters as well. The stories were later released in print form.

Additionally, Batman: Arkham City – End Game was released in May 2012 as digital-first comics, and later in print, and is set after the events of Arkham City and before its downloadable content, "Harley Quinn's Revenge". The story is written by Derek Fridolfs with art by Jason Shawn Alexander.

Batman: Arkham Origins tie-in
Batman: Arkham Origins is a digital-first comic, based on the game of the same name. Batman: Arkham Origins is the first title to feature the new DC2 Multiverse technology, that features dynamic artwork, action sounds and the ability to integrate a soundtrack, and allowing the reader to determine the fate of each storyline and character, with multiple options and end results available in each comic chapter. The comic, set across eight chapters, is a prequel to the game's story, and was created by digital studio, Madefire.

Batman: Arkham Knight tie-ins
Batman: Arkham Knight is a digital-first prequel comic to the game of the same name. Written by Peter J. Tomasi, with art by Viktor Bogdanovic and Art Thibert, and covers by Dan Panosian, the comic picks up after the events of Arkham City. It was released digitally in February 2015, with the first print release featuring a collection of the digital issues in March 2015.

Batman: Arkham Knight – Batgirl Begins is a promotional one-shot comic that was distributed for free at San Diego Comic-Con International. Written by Tim Seeley and illustrated by Matthew Clark and Wade Von Grawbadger, the comic tells the story of Barbara Gordon's first adventure as Batgirl.

Batman: Arkham Knight – Genesis, is a six-issue series written by Peter Tomasi and illustrated by Alisson Borges, that explores the origin of the Arkham Knight.

Suicide Squad: Kill the Justice League tie-in 
A forthcoming five-issue series entitled Suicide Squad: Kill Arkham Asylum will serve as a prequel to the game.

Collections 
 Batman: Arkham City (collects Batman: Arkham City #1–5 and Batman: Arkham City – Digital Chapters #1–5; 168 pages; hardcover, October 2011, ; paperback, September 2012)
 Batman: Arkham Unhinged
  Volume One (collects Batman: Arkham Unhinged #1–5 and Batman: Arkham City – Digital Chapters #6–7; 160 pages; hardcover, February 2013, ; paperback, August 2013)
  Volume Two (collects Batman: Arkham Unhinged #6–10; 168 pages; hardcover, August 2013, ; paperback, January 2013)
  Volume Three (collects Batman: Arkham Unhinged #11–15 and Batman: Arkham City – End Game #1-6; 232 pages; hardcover, January 2014, ; paperback, August 2014)
  Volume Four (collects Batman: Arkham Unhinged #16–20; 168 pages; hardcover, August 2014, ; paperback, February 2015)
 Batman: Arkham Origins (collects Batman: Arkham Origins chapters #1–14; 160 pages; hardcover, December 2014, ; paperback, July 2015)
 Batman: Arkham Knight
  Volume One (collects Batman: Arkham Knight #1–4; 144 pages; hardcover, July 2015, ; paperback, January 2016)
  Volume Two (collects Batman: Arkham Knight #5–9 and Batman: Arkham Knight – Batgirl Begins #1; 160 pages; hardcover, March 2016, ; paperback, July 2016)
  Volume Three (collects Batman: Arkham Knight #10–12, Batman: Arkham Knight Annual #1, Batman: Arkham Knight – Robin Special #1, and Batman: Arkham Knight – Harley Quinn and Batgirl Special #1–2; 176 pages; hardcover, July 2016, ; paperback, November 2016)
 Batman: Arkham Knight – Genesis (collects Batman: Arkham Knight – Genesis #1–6; 144 pages; hardcover, March 2016, ; paperback, September 2016)
 Batman: The Arkham Saga Omnibus (collects Batman: Arkham Asylum – The Road to Arkham #1 and all previous collections; 1,648 pages; hardcover, September 2018)
 Suicide Squad: Kill Arkham Asylum (collects Suicide Squad: Kill Arkham Asylum #1–5; 120 pages; hardcover, November 2023)

Film

An animated film set in the Arkhamverse, entitled Batman: Assault on Arkham, was released on August 12, 2014. Many actors involved with the games reprised their roles, including Kevin Conroy as Batman, Troy Baker as the Joker, Martin Jarvis as Alfred, and Nolan North as the Penguin. The film takes place about two years before the events of Batman: Arkham Asylum, and focuses on the Suicide Squad (consisting of Deadshot, Harley Quinn, Captain Boomerang, Killer Frost, the Black Spider and King Shark), who are sent by Amanda Waller to infiltrate Arkham Asylum and recover a classified file stolen by the Riddler. Although he is the title character, Batman is reduced to a supporting role, as he attempts to stop the Joker from destroying Gotham with a hidden bomb and briefly crosses paths with the Squad.

Novels

Batman: Arkham Knight – The Riddler's Gambit (2015)
A 320-page novel, Batman: Arkham Knight – The Riddler's Gambit, by Alexander C. Irvine serves as a prequel to Batman: Arkham Knight.

Batman: Arkham Knight – The Official Novelization (2015)
Marv Wolfman authored a novelization of Batman: Arkham Knight, which was released in July 2015.

Merchandise
Starting in January 2011, DC Direct released two series of statues based on characters in Arkham Asylum. As well, DC Direct, and later DC Collectibles, released four series of statues based on characters in Arkham City, starting in December 2011. On June 5, 2012, TriForce announced that they had acquired the license to create replicas of various weapons, gadgets and iconic objects from Arkham Asylum and Arkham City. DC Collectibles announced statues for release in October 2013 for Arkham Origins, as well as Mattel announcing statues of their own, releasing in late 2013. A board game, titled Batman: Arkham City Escape, was made available by Cryptozoic entertainment in May 2013.

Appearances in outside media
The game Injustice: Gods Among Us featured the Arkham City Skin Pack, containing downloadable costumes for Batman, Catwoman, and the Joker, based on their appearances in Arkham City. An Arkham City skin is also available for Harley Quinn; however, unlike the other Arkham City skins, it must be unlocked through the iOS mobile app version. In addition, the Arkham Asylum arena features appearances by Hugo Strange, Scarecrow, Killer Croc, Two-Face, Riddler, and Penguin, all of whom appear as they did in the previous Arkham games. The iOS version of the game features the Arkham Origins skins for Batman, Deathstroke, Deadshot, Joker and Bane, as well the Arkham Knight skins for Batman, Catwoman, Batgirl, Harley Quinn and the exclusive character Arkham Knight. The Arkham Knight costume for Batman also appears in the iOS version of Injustice 2.

The character Arkham Knight eventually made his debut in the mainstream DC Universe. However, this incarnation is not Jason Todd, but rather Astrid Arkham, the daughter of Arkham Asylum director Jeremiah Arkham and Ingrid Karlsson. During her birth, a riot broke out during a prison transfer at the asylum. Despite the chaos, several villains assisted in delivering her safely, but one of the prisoners killed Ingrid with one of Batman's batarangs. Astrid grew up interacting with many of Arkham Asylum's patients and sympathized with their fear of Batman. After she found footage of her mother's death, she assumed Batman murdered her and trained herself for years to take away Batman's control over Gotham. She crafted the Arkham Knight identity to take vengeance on him, believing that the Arkham inmates were also his victims.

Reception

The series has received widespread critical acclaim and commercial success, achieving lifetime international sales of 30+ million copies worldwide and high scores from critics and gamers. Arkham Asylum sold more than 9.4 million copies and held the Guinness World Record for Most Critically Acclaimed Superhero Game Ever based on an average Metacritic score of 91.67, but was replaced by its sequel Arkham City in 2011. The game was praised as reaching to a darker side of Batman not seen in video games before. It was also acclaimed for its polished combat and stealth gameplay, as well as selection of gadgets at Batman's disposal and the extensive comic book lore and easter eggs planted all over the map of Arkham Asylum. Arkham Asylum also received positive feedback for its choice in voice actors, such as Mark Hamill and Kevin Conroy as The Joker and Batman, respectively. The Guardian included the game on its list of the 50 best videogames of the 21st century.

Arkham City has received the highest critical acclaim of the series, sold over 14 million copies worldwide and won multiple awards, and is considered the greatest comic book video game of all time. It was heralded as taking the already innovative and intricate gameplay of its predecessor and largely expanding on it, as well as opening gameplay to a larger, greater detailed and intricate map. Hamill's return as a sick and dying Joker was very well taken by fans and critics alike, as well as the addition of other villains and heroes such as Robin, Catwoman, Hugo Strange, Calendar Man, and The Penguin. Arkham City currently holds Guinness World Record for Most Critically Acclaimed Superhero Game Ever with the average GameRankings score of 95.94%. Metacritic put the game among the best videogames of the decade 2010–2019.

Arkham Origins, while considered the weakest installment of the series, was still generally well received and was a commercial success, selling more than 5 million copies. The major consensus among critics was the game lacked innovation and series advancement, many of them citing the similar gameplay and atmosphere of the game before, but that it still had an interesting and engaging story. The visuals were also slightly degraded from the previous entry. This was largely attributed to the change in developers from Rocksteady to Warner Bros. Montreal. Arkham Origins was also criticized for its many bugs and glitches, especially on PC, as well as its odd and confined multiplayer. However, praise was directed at the voice cast and narrative, the game's depiction of the Joker as well as Batman's relationships with his adversaries. Most notably, critics agreed that Arkham Origins boss battles were an improvement over its predecessors; they offered dynamic, multiphase conflicts with their own stories. While not considering all equally fun or impressive, reviewers said that their variety and unpredictability provided much excitement.

The console versions of Arkham Knight received critical acclaim but slightly less than Arkham City and Arkham Asylum. However, it was still better received than its predecessor, Arkham Origins and was a notable commercial success, selling more than 6 million copies. Praise was aimed at the narrative, score, writing, visuals, world designs, and gameplay, while most of the criticism was directed towards the game's overreliance on Batmobile gameplay sections and parts of the game's storyline. The Windows version of the game was received with ambivalent responses, being criticized for numerous technical issues at the time of its launch, resulting in Warner Bros. removing the game from sale on Steam, and physical copies being removed from shelves, promising to work on performance issues. After its re-release, the game continued to receive criticism for lingering technical issues. The console versions were released with little to no technical problems. Mashable put the game among the best videogames of the decade 2010–2019.

See also
 Gotham Knights: a video game developed by WB Games Montréal (who developed Arkham: Origins), featuring similar gameplay mechanics, aestethics, and many of the same characters as the Batman: Arkham games, but with an original storyline not set in the Arkhamverse

References

External links

 
Action-adventure games
Stealth video games
Video game franchises
Video game franchises introduced in 2009
Warner Bros. Games franchises
Video games set in the United States